Tim Boyle may refer to:

Tim Boyle (Australian footballer) (born 1984), Australian rules footballer
Tim Boyle (American football) (born 1994), American football quarterback
Tim Boyle (businessman) (born 1949), American billionaire